Seneca – On the Creation of Earthquakes is a 2023 German-Moroccan historical drama dark comedy film directed by Robert Schwentke, starring John Malkovich as Seneca. The film is about the last days of the ancient philosopher Lucius Annaeus Seneca and the beginnings of Emperor Nero's despotic regime in Ancient Rome.

It is selected at the 73rd Berlin International Film Festival in Berlinale Special Gala, where it had its world premiere on 20 February 2023. It is scheduled for release in cinemas on March 23, 2023.

Synopsis

Emperor Claudius banishes Seneca and marries young Agrippina. Later, she requests that Seneca tutor their 12-year-old son Nero. Seneca returns and stands by Nero for several years, exerting a great influence on him, even after he becomes emperor. In 65 AD,  Nero struggles to defend his tyrannical claim to sovereignty. Seneca, accused of being part of a conspiracy against Nero, is ordered to kill himself.

Cast
 John Malkovich as Seneca 
 Tom Xander as Nero
 Wolfram Koch as Fabius 
 Louis Hofmann as Lucilius 
 Lilith Stangenberg as Pompeia Paulina
 
 Samia Chancrin as Balbina 
 Waldemar Kobus as Sergeant 
 Annika Meier as Cecilia 
 Lauren Wagner as Tigellinus
 Alexander Fehling as Decimus 
 Geraldine Chaplin as Cecilia 
 Blerim Destani as Piso 
 Samuel Finzi as Status 
 Andrew Koji as Felix 
 Mary-Louise Parker as Agrippina
 Julian Sands as Rufus 
 Guido Broscheit as Lucius

Production
Filming began on 25 September 2021 in the southern Moroccan city of Ouarzazate. On 29 October 2021, the schedule was completed.

Release
Seneca – On the Creation of Earthquakes had its  premiere on 20 February 2023 as part of the 73rd Berlin International Film Festival, in Berlinale Gala Special. It is scheduled to release in cinemas on March 23, 2023. It was reported in December 2022 that Picture Tree Intl, a Berlin-based sales company has taken up the sale of the film.

Reception

On the review aggregator Rotten Tomatoes website, the film has an approval rating of 20% based on 5 reviews, with an average rating of 1.7/10.

Wendy Ide for ScreenDaily wrote in review that "It’s a film that features a lot of empty posturing, extravagant wigs, distracting set design full of stuff that is inexplicably on fire in the background, and numerous over-masticated performances." Stephen Farber of The Hollywood Reporter calling the film "lame historical lampoon" wrote, "The problem is with the underlying conception. Schwentke’s attempt to create a parable of the decline of the American empire seems mainly forced and fatuous."

Accolades

References

External links
 
 
 Seneca – On the Creation of Earthquakes at Berlinale
 Seneca – On the Creation of Earthquakes – Official Trailer at YouTube
 theSeneca – On the Creation of Earthquakes at Picture Tree 
 Seneca – On the Creation of Earthquakes at Film portal 
 

2023 films
2023 drama films
Films directed by Robert Schwentke
2020s German films
German historical drama films
2020s German-language films
German black comedy films
Moroccan drama films
Films shot in Morocco
Arte France Cinéma films